The Housing and Urban Development Corporation Limited (HUDCO) is an Indian public sector undertaking engaged in housing finance and infrastructure project finance.

History
This institution came into existence on 25, April, 1970 as a private limited company under the complete ownership of Indian Government with an equity base of Rs. 2 crore under the Companies Act, 1956. It was created against the backdrop of housing deficit in India in 1960s and 70s,  with the objective of addressing issue of housing finance and playing role in urban infrastructure development. The organisation provides finance for setting up of new towns and also works as consultancy services for the projects of designing and planning relating to Housing and Urban Development programs in India as well as abroad. HUDCO won UN-Habitat Scroll of Honour Award for the contributions to the development of housing in 1991. The institution was conferred with miniratna status in 2004.

Infrastructure 
HUDCO started financing for development of infrastructures in 1989. The priority was giving for infrastructure facilities including projects in the sectors of drainage, electricity, water supply, sewerage, solid waste management and roads in the urban areas. Later the social infrastructure components like primary schools and play grounds, hostels for working women, healthcare centres, police stations and jails, courts, etc. received benefit of funding for low cost.

Road and Transport 
HUDCO has provided term loans for construction of roads and other transportation sectors which includes construction of Airport, Railways, Ports, Metro Rails, Bridges and Flyover, Railway Over-bridges, Subways, Bypasses, Bus Terminal, Parking complexes, Purchase of public transport vehicles, Bus Stops/stations, Intelligent Traffic Management system etc. Airports projects of Cochin International Airport and Calicut International Airport in Kerala are supported by HUDCO. The infrastructure for Kerala State Road Transport Corporation and UPSRTC are also funded by them. HUDCO sanctioned 100 crore rupees for KSRTC in 2002 for purchasing 550 buses and 350 mini-buses and 260 crores in 2014 for purchasing 1500 buses.

Solid Waste Management 
In 1994 HUDCO set up a Waste Management Cell for promotion of municipal waste management.

Sewerage and Drainage 
HUDCO has sanctioned 58 schemes with a project cost of Rs 675 crore to provide new systems and to augment the existing systems.

Water Supply 
295 water supply schemes, with a project cost of Rs 5,285 crore was funded by HUDCO. In 2016 HUDCO has also given finance to Nellore's underground drainage project proposed by Nellore Municipal Corporation.

References

External links
 Hudco Official Website

1970 establishments in Delhi
Financial services companies established in 1970
Government-owned companies of India
Companies based in New Delhi
Urban planning in India
Housing finance companies of India
Companies listed on the National Stock Exchange of India
Companies listed on the Bombay Stock Exchange